Arun Muralidhar Ogiral (25 September 1942 – 26 February 2004) was an Indian cricketer who played first-class cricket for Vidarbha from 1960 to 1976.

A right-arm off-spin bowler and lower-order batsman, Ogiral holds the record for the best innings figures for Vidarbha: 8 for 39 against Madhya Pradesh in 1967-68. He was also selected six times to play for Central Zone. In Central Zone's innings loss to the touring West Indians in 1974-75 he took 5 for 186, including the wicket of Viv Richards caught behind.

References

External links

1942 births
2004 deaths
Indian cricketers
Cricketers from Nagpur
Vidarbha cricketers
Central Zone cricketers